Voltea pa' que te enamores is a Venezuelan telenovela written by Monica Montañez and produced by Venevisión between 2006 and 2007. The series was distributed internationally by Venevisión International.

Daniela Alvarado and Jonathan Montenegro starred as the main protagonists.

Plot
Dileidy María López is a young woman who makes a living selling newspapers on a corner of a downtown avenue in Caracas. She dreams of becoming an engineer and becoming the girlfriend of Luis Fernando García, a young man she sees everyday when the traffic lights turn red when he passes by the corner where she sells newspapers. One day, Dileidy sees a newspaper advertisement for a party being hosted by Luis Fernando's family. It is at this party that Dileidy and Luis Fernando meet and fall in love. But the couple will have to face several issues. Luis Fernando is a coveted bachelor with a less formal relationship with Felicita and Tatianita, her best friend. Again, Gladis, Dileidy's mother, is the maid working at Luis Fernando's family home. Gladis is a tough, single mother who has suffered a lot from love, and does not want her daughter to be left alone and cheated by men.

At the same time, in the neighborhood where Dileidy lives, a young man will arrive, Aureliano Márquez. Aureliano has a dark past, which he wants to forget, especially when he meets Dileidy, falls in love with her and will fight to be a better man capable of conquering her. Aureliano will face Luis Fernando for the love of Dileidy.

Cast

Main
 Daniela Alvarado as Dileidy María López
 Jonathan Montenegro as Luis Fernando García Malavé
 Mimí Lazo as Gladis López
 Adrián Delgado as Aureliano Márquez

Supporting
 Carolina Perpetuo as María Antonia (La Nena) Cifuentes Vda de Aristiguieta
 Franklin Virgüez as Gabriel "Gabito" Márquez
 Rafael Romero as Gonzalo Malave
 Sonia Villamizar as Pascua "Pascuita" de Guzmán
 Juan Manuel Montesinos as Ramón (Monchito) Guzmán
 María Antonieta Duque as Matilde Sánchez
 Rolando Padilla as Dorotheo "Theo" Ricon
 Elba Escobar as Eglee Malavé de García
 Carlos Mata as Rómulo García
 Raúl Amundaray as José Tadeo Malavé
 Martín Lantigua as Constantino Benítez
 Manuel Escolano as Marco Aurelio Granados
 Anabell Rivero as Betzaida Conde
 Mirtha Pérez as "Nelly de Conde"
 Zair Montes as Feliz "Felicita" Guzmán
 José Luis Useche as Santiago
 Patricia Schwarzgruber as Tatiana "Tatianita" Aristiguieta Cifuentes
 Marisol Matheus as Rosita de Malavé
 Prakriti Maduro as Yeniluz Rincón
 Damián Genovese as Gerson López
 Sindy Lazo as Cristina García Malavé
 Vanessa Pose as Alegría Guzmán
 Cristian Mcgaffney as Ernesto
 Erika Santiago as Yuraima
 María Fernanda León as María Gracia
 Lisbeth Manrique as María José
 Héctor Zambrano as Héctor
 Luis José Santander as Paco Aristigueta

References

External links
 

2006 telenovelas
2007 telenovelas
Venevisión telenovelas
2006 Venezuelan television series debuts
Venezuelan telenovelas
2007 Venezuelan television series endings
Spanish-language telenovelas
Television shows set in Caracas